The Central African Republic records in swimming are the fastest ever performances of swimmers from the Central African Republic, which are recognised and ratified by the Fédération Centrafricaine de Natation (FCN).

All records were set in finals unless noted otherwise.

Long Course (50 m)

Men

Women

Short Course (25 m)

Men

Women

References

External links
 FCN official website

Central African Republic
Records
Swimming